This is a list of volumes and chapters of the science fiction manga Planetes by Makoto Yukimura. The series was originally published by Kodansha in the manga magazine Weekly Morning from January 1999 to January 2004 and collected in four tankōbon volumes. It is licensed in English in North America by Tokyopop, where it was published in five volumes by splitting the last volume in two parts. The list below follows the Japanese publication but notes the division of the last volume in English.

Each chapter of the manga is called a "phase".


Volume list

See also
 List of Planetes episodes

References

Planetes
Planetes